Dr Catherine Ball is a businesswoman and futurist with a focus on environmental science and technology. She is an Associate Professor at The Australian National University in the College of Engineering, Computing and Cybernetics. 

Ball has worked with drone technology, and her team operated a drone that could fly hundreds of kilometres. They flew it off the west coast of Australia to study and track turtle habitats. During this 'voyage' they found endangered animals that had not been seen for years.

Ball operates a number of businesses and has a successful professional speaking profile.

Education 
Ball attended Higham Lane School and King Edward VI College, Nuneaton.

Publications 

Ball, Catherine (2022). Converge: A futurist's insights into the potential of our world as technology and humanity collide.
 

Google Scholar Reference

References

Australian businesspeople
Living people
Year of birth missing (living people)